The cut and restore rope trick is a magic effect in which the performer cuts a piece of rope (usually tied into a knot) which then appears to be magically restored. Sometimes the trick is done with a piece of string, a handkerchief, or a turban instead of an actual rope.

Method 
There are many variations on the cut and restore rope trick, but most or all are variations on three basic methods.

The first method involves using sleight of hand to make the viewers believe that the rope is being cut at the middle, but really it is being cut close to the end. The result is a piece of rope nearly as long as the original and the viewers won't notice the slight change in length.

The second method involves introducing a short piece of rope of the same type as the main rope, and cutting that instead. This can be accomplished by many sleight of hand tricks but attaching it to the main rope disguised as the loop of a knot is the most common method. When the performer removes the knot, the original rope is completely uncut.

The third method involves gimmicked ropes that can literally be rejoined with the use of adhesives or some other method. Usually, the gimmicked ends of the rope are the original two ends, so each segment is 180 degrees from where it started, with the freshly cut portions on the end.

References 

Magic tricks